Yeh Chun-chang (born 25 October 1972) is a Taiwanese baseball player who competed at the 2004 Summer Olympics and at the 2008 Summer Olympics.

References

1972 births
Asian Games medalists in baseball
Baseball players at the 1994 Asian Games
Baseball players at the 2004 Summer Olympics
Baseball players at the 2006 Asian Games
Baseball players at the 2008 Summer Olympics
Living people
Olympic baseball players of Taiwan
Baseball players from Taipei
Asian Games bronze medalists for Chinese Taipei
Medalists at the 1994 Asian Games
Asian Games gold medalists for Chinese Taipei
Medalists at the 2006 Asian Games
EDA Rhinos managers
Fubon Guardians managers
Wei Chuan Dragons managers